Bakhrabad massacre was a massacre of the Hindu population of Bakhrabad village, in the district of the Comilla, on 24 May 1971 by the Pakistani army with the help of Al Badr and Al Shams, during the Bangladesh Liberation War.

References 

Massacres in 1971
Bangladesh Liberation War
1971 in Bangladesh
1971 Bangladesh genocide
Massacres of Bengali Hindus in East Pakistan
Massacres committed by Pakistan in East Pakistan
May 1971 events in Asia